Bupleurum lancifolium is a species of flowering plant in the family Apiaceae known by the common name lanceleaf thorow-wax. It is native to the Mediterranean Basin and it is known elsewhere, including parts of North America, as an introduced species. The inflorescence is a compound umbel borne on a peduncle which may be several centimeters tall. The umbel is surrounded by five wide, round to oval, and sometimes pointed bractlets at the base. The flowers are yellow to yellow-green.

External links
Jepson Manual Treatment
USDA Plants Profile
European Wildflowers Photos

lancifolium
Flora of Malta